The black Pilbara gecko (Heteronotia atra) is a species of gecko. It is endemic to Australia.

References

Heteronotia
Reptiles described in 2013
Geckos of Australia